David Atkinson (born 27 April 1993) is an English footballer who plays as a defender for  club Shildon. He played in the Football League for Carlisle United.

Club career

Atkinson joined Middlesbrough's academy as an under-nine. He was a member of the Middlesbrough under-15 squad that won the English qualifying competition for the 2007–08 Manchester United Premier Cup, and took up a two-year scholarship with the club in 2009. After the first twelve months, he was given his first professional contract, of four years; at that time, he was recovering from a stress fracture in his back, and his progress was later disrupted by a serious knee injury. He went on to captain Middlesbrough's under-21 team, and in the second half of the 2013–14 season, was a regular member of the first-team squad. After eight consecutive Championship matches on the bench, Middlesbrough manager Aitor Karanka said that Atkinson was training well and was in his thoughts for a debut, but would not force him into a "difficult game" that might adversely affect his confidence. He remained unused, and in September 2014, still without having played first-team football for Middlesbrough, joined League Two club Hartlepool United on a month's loan. He lost time to a hamstring injury, the manager who signed him, Colin Cooper, resigned in the middle of his loan spell, and he made no senior appearances.

He spent time on trial with League One club Walsall in February 2015, brought in by manager Dean Smith to check him out ahead of a possible summer signingaccording to Smith, "He is someone [Middlesbrough] have thought highly of, but has not quite burst onto the first team scene as they would have liked.before signing for Carlisle United of League Two on loan on 26 March. It was with Carlisle that he finally made his Football League debut, on 28 March in a 2–1 loss away to Oxford United, and he made six more appearances. At the end of a 2014–15 season in which Middlesbrough's under-21s won the U21 Premier League Second Division title and added the North Riding Senior Cup, beating Guisborough Town in the final, Atkinson was not offered a new contract.

On 4 June 2015, Atkinson signed a short-term deal with Carlisle United. Six months later, he extended his contract until June 2017.

On 1 December 2016, Atkinson joined Blyth Spartans on loan for a month. The loan was initially extended, and then made permanent when Atkinson left Carlisle by mutual consent. He also spent time playing in Iceland for ÍBV, with which he won the 2017 Icelandic Cup and played in the UEFA Europa League.

Atkinson joined Darlington for the 2019–20 season, but ankle ligaments damaged during pre-season restricted his appearances. He left the club after the abandoned 2020–21 National League North season, and signed for Shildon.

International career
Atkinson made his debut for the England under-16 team on 28 November 2008. He played the first half of the 2–0 win against Scotland that confirmed England as winners of that year's Victory Shield. Although not originally selected for the Montaigu Tournament in 2009, he came into the squad after Nico Yennaris withdrew, and started two of the three group matches and played the whole of the final, in which England U16 beat Germany on penalties to successfully defend their title.

Atkinson was named in the England under-17 squad for matches against France, Ukraine and hosts Portugal at the Algarve Tournament in February 2010. He played in two matches to help England finish as runners-up. He was placed on standby for the England under-18s' friendly against Italy in April 2011, but was not needed.

Career statistics

References

External links

1993 births
Living people
People from Shildon
Footballers from County Durham
English footballers
England youth international footballers
Association football defenders
Middlesbrough F.C. players
Hartlepool United F.C. players
Carlisle United F.C. players
Blyth Spartans A.F.C. players
David Atkinson
Darlington F.C. players
Shildon A.F.C. players
English Football League players
Northern Premier League players
David Atkinson
National League (English football) players